A total solar eclipse occurred on June 20, 1974.  A solar eclipse occurs when the Moon passes between Earth and the Sun, thereby totally or partly obscuring the image of the Sun for a viewer on Earth. A total solar eclipse occurs when the Moon's apparent diameter is larger than the Sun's, blocking all direct sunlight, turning day into darkness. Totality occurs in a narrow path across Earth's surface, with the partial solar eclipse visible over a surrounding region thousands of kilometres wide.

The path of totality passed over the Indian Ocean, Amsterdam Island, and Western Australia. The partial eclipse was visible from Madagascar, Indonesia, Australia, and the southwestern coast of South Island, New Zealand.

Related eclipses

Eclipses in 1974 
 A partial lunar eclipse on Tuesday, 4 June 1974.
 A total solar eclipse on Thursday, 20 June 1974.
 A total lunar eclipse on Friday, 29 November 1974.
 A partial solar eclipse on Friday, 13 December 1974.

Solar eclipses of 1971–1974

Saros 146 

It is a part of Saros cycle 146, repeating every 18 years, 11 days, containing 76 events. The series started with partial solar eclipse on September 19, 1541. It contains total eclipses from May 29, 1938 through October 7, 2154, hybrid eclipses from October 17, 2172 through November 20, 2226, and annular eclipses from December 1, 2244 through August 10, 2659. The series ends at member 76 as a partial eclipse on December 29, 2893. The longest duration of totality was 5 minutes, 21 seconds on June 30, 1992.
<noinclude>

Metonic series

References

External links 

1974 06 20
1974 in science
1974 06 20
June 1974 events